Benton Square railway station served the district of Benton, Tyne and Wear, England, from 1909 to 1915 on the Blyth and Tyne Railway.

History 
The station was opened on 1 July 1909 by the North Eastern Railway. It served the colliery in Benton Square. The only facility it had was a booking shed on the nearby road. It closed on 20 September 1915 as a wartime economy measure.

References

External links 

Disused railway stations in Tyne and Wear
Former North Eastern Railway (UK) stations
Railway stations opened in 1909
Railway stations closed in 1915
1909 establishments in England
1915 disestablishments in England
Railway stations in Great Britain opened in the 20th century